is a Japanese swimmer, who specialized in freestyle events. She represented her nation Japan at the 2008 Summer Olympics, placing herself in the seventh position as a member of the 4 × 200 m freestyle relay team. Takanabe is a student at National Institute of Fitness and Sports in Kanoya, Kagoshima.

Takanabe competed as a member of the Japanese team in the 4 × 200 m freestyle relay at the 2008 Summer Olympics in Beijing. Despite missing out the individual spot in the 200 m freestyle, she managed to place third at the Olympic trials in Tokyo (2:01.39) to earn an outright selection on the relay squad. Teaming with Haruka Ueda, Maki Mita, and Misaki Yamaguchi, Takanabe closed the race with a split of 2:01.83, but the Japanese team had to settle for seventh place in 7:57.56.

References

External links
NBC Olympics Profile

1985 births
Living people
Olympic swimmers of Japan
Swimmers at the 2008 Summer Olympics
Japanese female freestyle swimmers
People from Kama, Fukuoka
Sportspeople from Fukuoka Prefecture